The Eighteenth Canadian Ministry was the cabinet chaired by Prime Minister John Diefenbaker.  It governed Canada from 21 June 1957 to 22 April 1963, including all of the 23rd, 24th, and 25th Canadian Parliaments.  The government was formed by the Progressive Conservative Party of Canada.

Ministers

References

Succession

18
Ministries of Elizabeth II
1957 establishments in Canada
1963 disestablishments in Canada
Cabinets established in 1957
Cabinets disestablished in 1963